, provisional designation , is a trans-Neptunian object on an eccentric orbit from the scattered disc, located in the outermost region of the Solar System. It was discovered on 20 May 2012, by astronomers with the Pan-STARRS survey at Haleakala Observatory, Hawaii, United States.

Orbit and classification 

 is a scattered disc object and orbits the Sun at a distance of 35.5–88.0 AU once every 485 years and 4 months (177,277 days; semi-major axis of 61.76 AU). Its orbit has an eccentricity of 0.43 and an inclination of 10° with respect to the ecliptic.

The body's observation arc begins with a precovery taken by Pan-STARRS in May 2010, two years prior to its official discovery observation. It still has a small orbital uncertainty of 1 and 2, respectively.

Numbering and naming 

This minor planet was numbered by the Minor Planet Center on 25 September 2018 and received the number  in the minor planet catalog. As of 2018, it has not been named.

Physical characteristics 

According to the Johnston's archive and American astronomer Michael Brown,  measures 293 and 302 kilometers in diameter based on an assumed albedo of 0.09 and 0.08, respectively. On his website, Michael Brown lists this object as a "possible" dwarf planet (200–400 km) which is the category with the lowest certainty in his 5-class taxonomic system. As of 2018, no spectral type and color indices, nor a rotational lightcurve have been obtained from spectroscopic and photometric observations. The body's color, rotation period, pole and shape remain unknown.

References

External links 
 List Of Centaurs and Scattered-Disk Objects, Minor Planet Center
 M.P.E.C. statistics for F51 – All MPECs
 Discovery Circumstances: Numbered Minor Planets (520001)-(525000) – Minor Planet Center
 
 

523706
523706
523706
20120520